Cody Johnson is an English professional footballer who plays as a midfielder for  club Stockport County.

Career
In April 2022, Johnson signed a professional two-year contract with Stockport County at the age of seventeen, having already featured for the club in the FA Trophy in a game against Cheshunt where he was named as man of the match; academy manager Damien Allen said that "he has a bright future ahead of him". He had earlier spent time on loan at Stockport Town in the North West Counties League Division One South. He made his first appearance of the 2022–23 season on 20 September 2022, in a 2–1 defeat to Wolverhampton Wanderers U21 in an EFL Trophy fixture at Edgeley Park.

Career statistics

References

Living people
English footballers
Association football midfielders
Stockport County F.C. players
Stockport Town F.C. players
North West Counties Football League players
English Football League players
Year of birth missing (living people)